The Australia cricket team was scheduled to tour New Zealand in March 2022 to play three Twenty20 International (T20I) matches. The series would have overlapped with Australia's Test matches in Pakistan.

The initial tour schedule had the first two T20Is at the Wellington Regional Stadium. On 27 January 2022, New Zealand Cricket announced a change to the itinerary, with all matches being moved to McLean Park. However, on 9 February 2022, the tour was abandoned after there were no managed isolation quarantine (MIQ) spots available for the Australian team.

T20I series

1st T20I

2nd T20I

3rd T20I

References

External links
 Series home at ESPN Cricinfo

2022 in Australian cricket
2022 in New Zealand cricket
International cricket competitions in 2021–22
Cricket events cancelled due to the COVID-19 pandemic